, also known as Nozomi in the Sun, is a  Japanese manga series written by Keisuke Fujikawa and illustrated by Mayumi Suzuki. It also received an anime adaptation by Mushi Productions which ran for 26 episodes in 1971. Both Yoshiyuki Tomino and Yoshikazu Yasuhiko were involved in the production of Wandering Sun, and would later again collaborate on the ground-breaking and genre-defining series Brave Raideen and Mobile Suit Gundam. The anime toned down some of the more intense and mature elements of the manga for a prime-time TV audience.

Wandering Sun tells the story of two girls switched at birth by the nurse Michiko, out of a grudge against the parents of one of the newborns. Miki was born in the poor Mine family but is switched into the rich Kouda clan, and Nozomi the opposite. Fate cannot separate the two girls who compete to become successful singers after meeting at high school, with the girl-next-door Nozomi working hard and on her own to be the best pop singer in Japan and the rich girl Miki using her family's status to reach the same goal. This series was itself a ground-breaker in that it was perhaps the first anime series to depict the entertainment industry—specifically popular music, which would be a major plot point in many anime to come from Creamy Mami to Perfect Blue.
The TV series was also released in Italy under the title Jane e Micci and in France as Nathalie et ses Amis.

Cast 
Junko Fujiyama as Nozomi Mine
Michiko Hirai as Miki Kouda
Kōsei Tomita as Kumagoro
Makio Inoue as Fani
Ryōko Kinomiya as Michiko Nohara
Tesuya Asado as Isao Egawa
Koichi Noda as Jun Nohara
Mitsuko Aso as Tsune
Kinpei Azusa as Shinsuke Mine
Miyoko Asō as Shizuko Mine
Takako Kondo as Kazuo Mine
Waka Tachibana as Yuki Mine
Osamu Kobayashi as Daijiro
Ikuo Nishikawa as Yumemaro
Takeshi Aono as Akira Nitta

Staff 

 Original Creator: Keisuke Fujikawa, Mayumi Suzuki
 Script: Keisuke Fujikawa, Shun'ichi Yukimuro
 Character Designs: Yoshikazu Yasuhiko
 Storyboards: Yoshiyuki Tomino
 Music: Hideki Fuyuki
 Producer: Hiroshi Saito, Noboru Katano
 Production: Mushi Production, Fuji TV

References

External links 
 

Shogakukan manga
Shōjo manga
1971 anime television series debuts
Drama anime and manga
Mushi Production
Fuji TV original programming